Henry Robinson may refer to:

Academics
Henry Robinson (writer) (c. 1604–1664), English writer on religious tolerance
Henry Robinson (scientist), Librarian of the Yorkshire Philosophical Society and co-worker with John Phillips
Henry S. Robinson (1914–2003), American archaeologist

Arts and entertainment
Henry Crabb Robinson (1775–1867), British diarist
Henry Peach Robinson (1830–1901), British photographer
Henry Morton Robinson (1898–1961), American novelist
Spike Robinson (Henry Berthold Robinson, 1930–2001), jazz saxophonist

Religion
Henry Robinson (bishop) (c. 1553–1616), Bishop of Carlisle, 1598–1616
Henry Robinson (clergyman) (1819–1887), Church of England clergyman 
Henry Douglas Robinson (1859–1913), missionary bishop of the Episcopal Diocese of Nevada
H. Wheeler Robinson (1872–1945), English minister and theologian

Sports
Basil Robinson (cricketer) (Henry Basil Oswin Robinson, 1919–2012), Canadian cricketer
Henry Robinson (Yorkshire cricketer) (1858–1909), cricketer
Henry Robinson (Nottinghamshire cricketer) (1863–?), English cricketer
Henry Robinson (New South Wales cricketer) (1864–1931), New South Wales player
Henry Robinson (footballer) (1909–?), English footballer
Henry W. Robinson (1893–?), American college football player
Frazier Robinson (Henry Frazier Robinson, 1910–1997), American baseball player

Others
Sir Henry Robinson, 1st Baronet (1857–1927), Irish civil servant
Henry Robinson (spy) (1897–1944), intelligence agent of the Comintern murdered by the Gestapo

See also
Harry Robinson (disambiguation)
Robinson (name)